The Lamb Lies Down on Broadway is the sixth studio album by the English progressive rock band Genesis. It was released as a double album on 29 November 1974 by Charisma Records and is their last to feature original frontman Peter Gabriel. It peaked at No. 10 on the UK Albums Chart and No. 41 on the Billboard 200 in the US. It is currently their longest album to date.

While the band worked on new material at Headley Grange for three months, they decided to produce a concept album with a story devised by Gabriel about Rael, a Puerto Rican youth from New York City who is suddenly taken on a journey of self-discovery and encounters bizarre incidents and characters along the way. The album was marked by increased tensions within the band as Gabriel, who insisted on writing all of the lyrics, temporarily left to work with filmmaker William Friedkin and needed time to be with his family. Most of the songs were developed by the rest of the band through jam sessions and were put down at Glaspant Manor in Wales using a mobile studio.

The album received a mixed critical reaction at first, but it gained acclaim in subsequent years and has a cult following. The songs "Counting Out Time" and "The Carpet Crawlers" were released as singles in the UK in 1974 and 1975, respectively; both failed to chart. A single of "The Lamb Lies Down on Broadway" was released in the US. Genesis promoted the album with their 1974–75 tour across North America and Europe, playing the album in its entirety. The album reached Gold certification in the UK and the US. The album was remastered in 1994 and 2007, the latter as part of the Genesis 1970–1975 box set which contains a 5.1 surround sound mix and bonus material.

Background 
In May 1974, the Genesis line-up of frontman and singer Peter Gabriel, keyboardist Tony Banks, bassist Mike Rutherford, drummer Phil Collins and guitarist Steve Hackett finished their 1973–1974 tour of Europe and North America to support their fifth studio album, Selling England by the Pound (1973). That album was a critical and commercial success for the group, earning them their highest-charting release in the United Kingdom and the United States. That June they booked three months at Headley Grange, a large former poorhouse in Headley, East Hampshire, in order to write and rehearse new material for their next studio album. Upon their arrival the building had been left in a very poor state by the previous band to use it, with excrement on the floor and rat infestations. By this time the personal lives of some members had begun to affect the mood in the band, causing complications for their work. Hackett explained: "Everybody had their own agenda. Some of us were married, some of us had children, some of us were getting divorced, and we were still trying to get it together in the country". Banks later deemed this period of time as his least favourite of all his time in Genesis.

Production

Writing 

The band decided to produce a double album before they had agreed on its contents or direction, for the extended format presented the opportunity for them to put down more of their musical ideas. A single album of songs telling segments of a story did not appeal to them, and Banks thought they had gained a strong enough following by this point to put out two albums' worth of material that their fans would be willing to listen to. They had wanted to produce a concept album that told a story for some time, and Rutherford pitched an idea based on the fantasy novel The Little Prince by Antoine de Saint-Exupéry, but Gabriel considered it "too twee" and believed "prancing around in fairyland was rapidly becoming obsolete".

Gabriel presented a surreal story about a Puerto Rican youth named Rael who is suddenly taken on a spiritual journey of self-discovery and identity as he encounters a series of bizarre incidents and characters. He first thought of the story while touring North America in the previous year, and pitched a synopsis to the group until they agreed to go ahead with it. It was more detailed and obscure in its initial form until Gabriel refined it and made Rael the central character. Gabriel chose the name Rael as it was one without a particular ethnic origin, but he later realised the Who wrote about a character of the same name on The Who Sell Out (1967) which annoyed him at first, but he stuck to the choice. The band also found that "Ra" was common in male names in various nationalities. Gabriel was inspired by a variety of sources for the story including West Side Story, "a kind of punk" twist to the Christian allegory The Pilgrim's Progress, the works of Swiss psychologist Carl Jung, and the surreal Western film El Topo (1971) by Alejandro Jodorowsky. In contrast to Selling England by the Pound, which contained strong English themes, Gabriel made a conscious effort to avoid repetition and instead portray American imagery in his lyrics. He had the story begin on Broadway in New York City, and makes references to Caryl Chessman, Lenny Bruce, Groucho Marx, Marshall McLuhan, Howard Hughes, Evel Knievel and the Ku Klux Klan. Gabriel expressed some concern over the album's title shortly after its release, but clarified that the lamb itself is purely symbolic and a catalyst for the peculiar events that occur.

During the writing sessions at Headley Grange, Gabriel found himself separated from the rest of the band, which caused some friction. He insisted that having devised the concept he should write the lyrics, leaving the majority of the music in the charge of his bandmates. This was a departure from the band's usual method of songwriting, as lyrical contributions on previous albums had always involved the other members. This situation left Gabriel often secluded in one room writing the lyrics, and the remaining four rehearsing in another. In one instance Gabriel was unable to meet a scheduled deadline to have the lyrics finished, leaving Rutherford and Banks to write words for "The Light Dies Down on Broadway". At other times, Banks and Hackett suggested lyrics they thought would fit "The Lamia" and "Here Comes the Supernatural Anaesthetist" respectively, which Gabriel rebuffed.

Further disagreements arose during the writing period when Gabriel left the group for a short period having accepted an invitation from film producer William Friedkin to collaborate on a screenplay, after he took a liking to Gabriel's surreal story printed on the sleeve of Genesis Live (1973). In Gabriel's absence Collins suggested having the new studio album be purely instrumental, thinking it would favour the other members as Gabriel had made some of their earlier songs too lyrically dense, but the idea was rejected by the rest of the group. Friedkin, however, was not prepared to split the band over a mere idea and Gabriel resumed work on the album. Matters were complicated further when Gabriel spent additional time in London when his first wife Jill underwent a risky and difficult birth of their first child in July 1974, leaving Gabriel often travelling back and forth. Rutherford later admitted that he and Banks were "horribly unsupportive" of Gabriel during this time, and Gabriel saw this as the beginning of his eventual departure from Genesis.

Recording 
After their allocated time at Headley Grange came to an end, Genesis relocated to Glaspant Manor in Carmarthenshire, Wales to record the album. The remote location required them to use a mobile studio, and used one owned by Island Studios that was parked outside. The Island mobile featured two 3M 24-track recorders, a Helios Electronics 30-input mixing console, Altec monitors, and two A62 Studer tape machines for mastering. The album is the band's last with John Burns as co-producer, who had assumed the role since Foxtrot (1972). Engineering duties were carried out by David Hutchins. Burns and Gabriel experimented with different vocal effects by recording takes in a bathroom and in a cowshed two miles away. Rutherford thought the album's sound was an improvement to past Genesis albums for it was not recorded in a professional studio, which benefited the sound of Collins' drums. Collins compared the sound of the album to that of Neil Young's recordings made in his barn, "not studio, not soundproof, but a woody quality". Gabriel said one track was recorded directly onto a cassette which was used on the album.

The backing tracks were put down in roughly two weeks. Gabriel was still working on the lyrics a month later, and asked the band to produce additional music for "Carpet Crawl" and "The Grand Parade of Lifeless Packaging" so he could fit in words that had no designated section for them. Thinking the extra material was to be instrumental, the band later found that Gabriel had sung over their new parts, something that he also had done on Foxtrot and Selling England by the Pound and caused songs to be musically dense. Gabriel recorded his remaining vocals at Island's main studio in Notting Hill, London, where the album was mixed over a series of shifts as they were pressured to finish the album in time for its release date. Collins recalled: "I'd be mixing and dubbing all night and then Tony and Mike would come in and remix what I'd done because I'd lost all sense of normality by that point".

Story 
Gabriel used New York City as a tool to make Rael "more real, more extrovert and violent", choosing to develop a character that is the least likely person to "fall into all this pansy claptrap", and aiming for a story that contrasted between fantasy and character. He explained that as the story progresses Rael finds he is not as "butch" as he hoped, and his experiences eventually bring out a more romantic side to his personality. Gabriel deliberately kept the ending ambiguous but clarified that Rael does not die, although he compared the ending to the buildup of suspense and drama in a film in which "you never see what's so terrifying because they leave it up in the air without ... labelling it". Several of the story's occurrences and settings derived from Gabriel's own dreams. Collins remarked that the entire concept was about split personality. The individual songs also make satirical allusions to mythology, the sexual revolution, advertising, and consumerism. Gabriel felt the songs alone were not enough to detail all of the action in his story, so he wrote the full plot on the album's sleeve.

Plot summary 

One morning in New York City, Rael is holding a can of spray paint, hating everyone around him. He witnesses a lamb lying down on Broadway which has a profound effect on him ("The Lamb Lies Down on Broadway"). As he walks along the street, he sees a dark cloud take the shape of a movie screen and slowly move towards him, finally absorbing him ("Fly on a Windshield"), seeing an explosion of images of the current day ("Broadway Melody of 1974") before he wakes up in a cave and falls asleep once again ("Cuckoo Cocoon"). Rael wakes up and finds himself trapped in a cage of stalactites and stalagmites which slowly close in towards him. As he tries to escape, he sees many other people in many other cages, before spotting his brother John outside. Rael calls to him, but John walks away and the cage suddenly disappears ("In the Cage").

Rael now finds himself on the floor of a factory and is given a tour of the area by a woman, where he watches people being processed like packages. He spots old members of his New York City gang, and also John with the number 9 stamped on his forehead. Fearing for his life, Rael escapes into a corridor ("The Grand Parade of Lifeless Packaging") and has an extended flashback of returning from a gang raid in New York City, ("Back in N.Y.C.") a dream where his hairy heart is removed and shaved with a razor, ("Hairless Heart") and his first sexual encounter ("Counting Out Time"). Rael's flashback ends, and he finds himself in a long, red-carpeted corridor of people crawling towards a wooden door. Rael runs past them and exits via a spiral staircase ("Carpet Crawl"). At the top, he enters a chamber with 32 doors, surrounded by people and unable to concentrate ("The Chamber of 32 Doors").

Rael finds a blind woman who leads him out of the chamber ("Lilywhite Lilith") and into another cave ("The Waiting Room"), where he becomes trapped by falling rocks ("Anyway"). Rael encounters Death ("Here Comes the Supernatural Anaesthetist") and escapes the cave. Rael ends up in a pool with three Lamia, beautiful snake-like creatures, and has sex with them, but they die after drinking some of his blood ("The Lamia"). He leaves the pool in a boat ("Silent Sorrow in Empty Boats"), and finds himself in a group of Slippermen, distorted, grotesque men who have all had the same experience with the Lamia, and finds that he has become one of them ("The Arrival"). Rael finds John among the Slippermen, who reveals that the only way to become human again is to visit Doktor Dyper and be castrated ("A Visit to the Doktor"). Both are castrated and keep their removed penises in containers around their necks. Rael's container is taken by a raven and he chases after it, leaving John behind ("The Raven"). The raven drops the container in a ravine and into a rushing underground river ("Ravine").

As Rael walks alongside it, he sees a window in the bank above his head which reveals his home amidst the streets ("The Light Dies Down on Broadway"). Faced with the option of returning home, he sees John in a river below him, struggling to stay afloat. Despite being deserted twice by John, Rael dives in to save him and the gateway to New York vanishes ("Riding the Scree"). Rael rescues John and drags his body to the bank of the river and turns him over to look at his face, only to see his own face instead ("In the Rapids"). His consciousness then drifts between both bodies, and he sees the surrounding scenery melting away into a haze. Both bodies dissolve, and Rael's spirit becomes one with everything around him ("it.").

Songs 

Much of the music developed through band improvisations and jams, often after setting a single idea, which Banks found particularly enjoyable. Examples of this are what he described as a "Chinese jam" which ended up as part of "The Colony of Slippermen", one named "Victory at Sea" which was worked into "Silent Sorrow in Empty Boats", and another known as "Evil Jam" which became "The Waiting Room". Though the album is written to a story concept, Gabriel described its format as being split into "self-contained song units". He thought the album contained some of the group's best material and songs that he was most proud of during his time in Genesis.

"The Lamb Lies Down on Broadway" was the last song that Banks and Gabriel wrote together before the latter's departure from the group, which Banks said was "a pretty good song to end on". At its conclusion, the song borrows music and lyrics from the 1963 single "On Broadway" by The Drifters. "Fly on a Windshield" originally came about through a band improvisation sparked by an idea from Rutherford, who suggested the idea of pharaohs going down the Nile and proceeded to play two chords. The rest of the group caught onto the idea, and Banks was particularly fond of the part when the drums and guitar come in, calling it one of the band's best ever moments. Hackett described his guitar parts as "Egyptian phrases", and noted that the group used a similar modulation to that of the end of Boléro by Maurice Ravel. "Back in N.Y.C." sees Genesis adopting a more aggressive sound than in past compositions, and includes Gabriel singing an expletive in the line: "I'm not full of shit". A personal highlight for Collins is "Silent Sorrow in Empty Boats" and "The Waiting Room", the latter of which developed as a "basic good to bad soundscaping" jam while it was raining outside. When the band stopped, a rainbow had formed. Collins remembered Hackett playing "these dark chords, then Peter blows into his oboe reeds, then there was a loud clap of thunder and we really thought we were entering another world or something. It was moments like that when we were still very much a unified five-piece".

"Carpet Crawl" developed at a time when Gabriel had written some lyrics, but no music had been written for them. The band put together a chord sequence "in D, E minor and F-sharp minor with a roll from the drums flowing through it". Gabriel spent "hours and hours" on an out-of-tune piano in the house of his then-wife Jill's parents in Kensington to develop the song, and Jill spoke of Gabriel's particular fondness of the track. "Anyway" and "Lilywhite Lilith" developed from two previously unreleased songs named "Frustration" and "The Light", respectively. Hackett's guitar solo on "Counting Out Time" was played using a EMS Synthi Hi-Fli guitar synthesizer.

While mixing at Island Gabriel asked Brian Eno, who was working on his album Taking Tiger Mountain (By Strategy) (1974), to add synthesized effects on his vocals on several tracks, including "The Grand Parade of Lifeless Packaging". Eno's work is credited on the liner notes for "Enossification". As a repayment, Eno asked Collins to play drums on his track "Mother Whale Eyeless".

Sleeve design 
Hipgnosis designed the album's artwork. In a departure from that company's previous album sleeves, which featured more colourful designs, the front cover of The Lamb Lies Down on Broadway makes use of black and white and no colour. The band's logo, originally designed by Paul Whitehead and used on Nursery Cryme (1971) and Foxtrot (1972), was replaced by a new one in an Art Deco style by George Hardie. The left picture on the front depicts Rael in the area where "In the Rapids" and "Riding the Scree" are set.

Release 
The band considered releasing the album as two single albums released six months apart. Gabriel later thought this idea would have been more suitable, for a double album contained too much new material, and the extra time would have given him more time to work on the lyrics. Nevertheless, The Lamb Lies Down on Broadway was released as a double album on 29 November 1974, days after the start of its supporting tour. It became the band's highest-charting album since their formation, peaking at No. 10 on the UK Albums Chart in December 1974 during its six-week stay on the chart, and No. 41 on the US Billboard 200 in 1975. Elsewhere, the album reached No. 15 in Canada and No. 34 in New Zealand. Two singles were released; "Counting Out Time" with "Riding the Scree" as its B-side, was released on 1 November 1974. The second, "The Carpet Crawlers" backed with a live performance of "The Waiting Room (Evil Jam)" at the Shrine Auditorium in Los Angeles, followed in April 1975. The album continued to sell, and reached Gold certification by the British Phonographic Industry on 1 February 1975, and Gold by the Recording Industry Association of America for sales in excess of 500,000 copies on 20 April 1990.

Critical reception 

Members of the group expressed some concern about the album's critical reception, and expected to receive some negative responses over its concept and extended format. Banks hoped the album would end people's comparisons of Genesis to Yes and Emerson, Lake & Palmer, two other popular progressive rock bands of the time. Gabriel knew the album's concept was ideal for critics "to get their teeth into".

In giving an interview to Melody Maker in October 1974, shortly before the album's release, Gabriel played several tracks from The Lamb to reporter Chris Welch, including "In the Cage", "Hairless Heart", "Carpet Crawlers", and "Counting Out Time". Welch wrote, "It sounded superb. Beautiful songs, fascinating lyrics, and sensitive, subtle playing, mixed with humour and harmonies. What more could a Genesis fan desire?" He singled out Collins' playing as "outstanding". Welch's review for Melody Maker published a month later included his thoughts on such long concept albums–"A few golden miraculous notes and some choice pithy words are worth all the clutter and verbiage"–and he called the album a "white elephant". For New Musical Express, Barbara Charone wrote highly of the collection. She summarised The Lamb as a combination of the "musical proficiency" on Selling England by the Pound (1973) with the "grandiose illusions" on Foxtrot (1972) and "a culmination of past elements injected with present abilities and future directions". Charone thought it had more high points than any previous Genesis album, apart from some "few awkward instrumental moments on side three". All members received praise for their performances, including Hackett coming across as a more dominant member of the group with his "frenetic, choppy style", Collins' backup harmony vocals and Rutherford's "thick, foreboding bass chords and gentle acoustics". Colin Irwin wrote a negative review of the "Counting Out Time" single, with its "weary, tepid approach" and a "woeful, dreary three and a half minutes".

Since its release, the album has been met with critical acclaim. In 1978, Nick Kent wrote for New Musical Express that it "had a compelling appeal that often transcended the hoary weightiness of the mammoth concept that held the equally mammoth four sides of vinyl together". In a special edition of Q and Mojo magazines titled Pink Floyd & The Story of Prog Rock, The Lamb ranked at No. 14 in its 40 Cosmic Rock Albums list. The album came third in a list of the ten best concept albums by Uncut magazine, where it was described as an "impressionistic, intense album" and "pure theatre (in a good way) and still Gabriel's best work". AllMusic reviewer Stephen Thomas Erlewine gave a retrospective rating of five stars out of five. He says that despite Gabriel's "lengthy libretto" on the sleeve "the story never makes sense", though its music is "forceful, imaginative piece of work that showcases the original Genesis lineup at a peak ... it's a considerable, lasting achievement and it's little wonder that Peter Gabriel had to leave ... they had gone as far as they could go together".

A Rolling Stone poll to rank readers' favourite progressive rock albums of all time placed The Lamb fifth in the list. In 2014, readers of Rhythm voted it the album with the fourth-greatest drumming in the history of progressive rock. In 2015, NME included the album in its "23 Maddest and Most Memorable Concept Albums" list for "taking in themes of split personalities, heaven and hell and truth and fantasy". It was one of two albums by Genesis included in the top ten of the Rolling Stone list of the 50 Greatest Prog Rock Albums of All Time. The magazine described it as "one of rock's more elaborate, beguiling and strangely rewarding concept albums". The album was also included in the book 1001 Albums You Must Hear Before You Die.

Banks later thought the album's concept the weakest thing about it, though the lyrics to some of the individual songs are "wonderful". Rutherford said that, while The Lamb is a fan favorite, it was a gruelling album to work on and had a lot of highs, but also a lot of lows. Hackett remarked how his guitar was underutilized in comparison to past albums, but thought the album had a lot of beautiful moments and has grown on him over time. In Genesis: Together and Apart, Gabriel stated the album was one of his two high points with the band, along with "Supper's Ready", Also in that documentary, Collins said the band created their best music on the album. He also cites it as his favourite Genesis album.

Reissues 
The Lamb Lies Down on Broadway was first remastered for CD in 1994, and released on Virgin Records in Europe and Atlantic Records in North America. The included booklet features the lyrics and story printed on the original LP, though some of the inner sleeve artwork was not reproduced. A remastered edition for Super Audio CD and DVD with new stereo and 5.1 surround sound mixes by Nick Davis was released in 2008 as part of the Genesis 1970–1975 box set.

Tour 

Genesis supported the album with a 102-date concert tour across North America and Europe, playing the album in its entirety with one or two older songs (usually "Watcher of the Skies" and "The Musical Box") as encores. Such a format was not supported by the entire band, considering most of the audience were not yet familiar with the large amount of new material. It was to begin on 29 October 1974 with an 11-date tour of the UK that sold out within four hours of going on sale, but after Hackett crushed a wine glass in his left hand which severed a tendon, and needed time to recover, these dates were rescheduled for 1975. The group lost money, for they were unable to recoup deposits they had paid to the venues. The tour began on 20 November in Chicago, and ended on 22 May 1975 in Besançon, France. The last two scheduled concerts on 24 and 27 May in Toulouse and Paris, respectively, were cancelled due to low ticket sales. Gabriel marked the occasion of his final show with the group by playing the "Last Post" on his oboe. Hackett estimated the band's debts at £220,000 at the tour's end.

The tour featured at the time some of the biggest instruments used by the band, including Rutherford's double-neck Rickenbacker and the largest drum kit ever used by Collins. The tour's stage show involved three backdrop screens that displayed 1,450 slides, designed by Geoffrey Shaw, from eight projectors and a laser lighting display. Banks recalled the slides only came close to working perfectly on four or five occasions. The tour was the high point of Gabriel's use of theatrics and costumes. He changed his appearance with a short haircut and styled facial hair and dressed as Rael in a leather jacket, T-shirt and jeans. During "The Lamia", he surrounded himself with a spinning cone-like structure decorated with images of snakes. In the last verse, the cone would collapse to reveal Gabriel wearing a body suit that glowed from lights placed under the stage. "The Colony of Slippermen" featured Gabriel as one of the Slippermen, covered in lumps with inflatable genitalia that emerged onto the stage by crawling out of a penis-shaped tube. Gabriel recalled the difficulty in placing his microphone near his mouth whilst he was in the costume. For "it.", an explosion set off twin strobe lights that reveal Gabriel and a dummy figure dressed identically on each side of the stage, leaving the audience clueless as to which was real. The performance ended with Gabriel vanishing from the stage in a flash of light and a puff of smoke. At the final concert, roadie Geoff Banks acted as the dummy on stage, wearing nothing but a leather jacket.

In one concert review, the theatrics for "The Musical Box", the show's encore and once the band's stage highlight, was seen as "crude and elementary" compared to the "sublime grandeur" of The Lamb... set. Music critics often focused their reviews on Gabriel's theatrics and took the band's musical performance as secondary, which irritated the rest of the band. Collins later said, "People would steam straight past Tony, Mike, Steve and I, go straight up to Peter and say, "You're fantastic, we really enjoyed the show." It was becoming a one-man show to the audience." The Rock and Roll Hall of Fame called the tour "a spectacle on par with anything attempted in the world of rock to that point".

Gabriel's departure 
During their stop in Cleveland in November 1974, Gabriel told the band he would leave at the conclusion of the tour. The decision was kept a secret from outsiders and media all through the tour, and Gabriel promised the band to stay silent about it for a while after its end in June 1975, to give them some time to prepare for a future without him. By August, the news had leaked to the media anyway, and Gabriel wrote a personal statement to the English music press to explain his reasons and his view of his career up to this point; the piece, titled "Out, Angels Out", was printed in several of the major rock music magazines. In his open letter, he explained his disillusion with the music industry and his wish to spend extended time with his family. Banks later stated, "Pete was also getting too big for the group. He was being portrayed as if he was 'the man' and it really wasn't like that. It was a very difficult thing to accommodate. So it was actually a bit of a relief."

Recordings 
No complete performance of the album has been officially released, except for the majority of the band's performance from 24 January 1975 at the Shrine Auditorium in Los Angeles, which was released as part of the Genesis Archive 1967–75 box set. Some tracks feature re-recorded vocals from Gabriel and guitar parts from Hackett; the box set contains a remixed studio version of "it.", also with re-recorded vocals. The album's 2007 reissue features the album with a visual reconstruction of the tour's stage show using the original backdrop slides, audience bootleg footage, and photographs.

Track listing 
All tracks credited to Tony Banks, Phil Collins, Peter Gabriel, Steve Hackett and Mike Rutherford. Actual songwriters listed below. All lyrics written by Peter Gabriel except where noted.

Personnel 
Genesis
Peter Gabriel – lead vocals, flute, varied instruments, "experiments with foreign sounds"
Steve Hackett – acoustic and electric guitars
Mike Rutherford – bass guitar, 12-string guitar
Tony Banks –  Hammond T-102 organ, RMI 368 Electra Piano and Harpsichord, Mellotron M-400, ARP Pro Soloist synthesizer, Elka Rhapsody string synthesizer, acoustic piano
Phil Collins – drums, percussion, vibraphone, backing vocals, second lead vocal on "Counting out Time", "The Supernatural Anaesthetist" and "The Colony of Slippermen"

Additional musicians
Brian Eno – "Enossification" on "In the Cage" and "The Grand Parade of Lifeless Packaging"

Production
John Burns – production
Genesis – production
David Hutchins – engineer
Hipgnosis – sleeve design, photography
Graham Bell – choral contribution
"Omar" – Rael on the album's artwork
Richard Manning – retouching
George Hardie – graphics (George Hardie N.T.A.)

Charts

Certifications

Notes and references

Notes

Citations

Bibliography

 

DVD media

External links
The Lamb Lies Down on Broadway – Complete Story by Peter Gabriel and Album Links archived
The "Ulysses" of Concept Albums by Jon Michaud The New Yorker 28 Feb 2014

1974 albums
Albums with cover art by Hipgnosis
Atco Records albums
Concept albums
Genesis (band) albums
Rock operas
Charisma Records albums
Albums produced by Peter Gabriel
Albums produced by Phil Collins
Albums produced by Tony Banks (musician)
Albums produced by Mike Rutherford